Norbert Lee Kerr (born December 10, 1948) is an American social psychologist and Emeritus Professor of Psychology at Michigan State University. As of 2014, he also held a part-time appointment as Professor of Social Psychology at the University of Kent in England. He has researched the Kohler effect and factors influencing decision-making by juries.

References

External links
Faculty page
Profile at Social Psychology Network

1948 births
Living people
People from Lebanon, Missouri
Washington University in St. Louis alumni
American social psychologists
University of Illinois Urbana-Champaign alumni
Michigan State University faculty
University of California, San Diego faculty
Academics of the University of Kent
Fellows of the Association for Psychological Science